People Like Us is the debut studio album by Scottish singer-songwriter Callum Beattie. It was released in the United Kingdom on 15 May 2020 by 3 Beat Records and AATW. The album peaked at number one on the Scottish Albums Charts. Callum had the backing support of drummer James Connor and guitarist Jake Bremner for parts of this album produced in May 2020. The album will be re-released on 27 November 2020 featuring five new songs including the singles "Fuckers" and "Don't Walk Alone".

Singles
"We Are Stars" was released as the lead single from the album on 31 March 2017. "Man Behind the Sun" was released as the second single from the album on 11 August 2017. "Connection" was released as the third single from the album on 28 March 2019. "Easter Road" was released as the fourth single from the album on 13 September 2019. "Talk About Love" was released as the fifth single from the album on 14 February 2020. "Some Heroes Don't Wear Capes" was released as the sixth single from the album on 12 May 2020. "Salamander Street" was released as the seventh single from the album on 26 June 2020. The song peaked at number six on the Scottish Singles Charts. "Fuckers" was released as the first single from the reissued edition of the album on 9 October 2020. The song peaked at number thirteen on the Scottish Singles Charts. "Don't Walk Alone" was released as the second single from the reissued edition of the album on 6 November 2020. The song peaked at number twelve on the Scottish Singles Charts. "Tear in My Eyes" was released as the third single from the reissued edition of the album on 5 February 2021.

Track listing
Credits adapted from Tidal.

Charts

Release history

References

2020 albums